Isla Apiao Airport  is an airport serving Isla Apiao (es), an island in the archipelago separating the Gulf of Ancud from the Gulf of Corcovado in the Los Lagos Region of Chile.

See also

Transport in Chile
List of airports in Chile

References

External links
OpenStreetMap - Isla Apiao
OurAirports - Isla Apiao
SkyVector - Isla Apiao

Airports in Chiloé Archipelago